Travels in Constants, Vol. 12 is an EP by the Scottish group Mogwai, and is part of Temporary Residence Limited's mail-order Travels in Constants series. It was released in 2001 through Temporary Residence Limited. The EP was included in its entirety on the 2014 reissue of Come On Die Young.

Overview
Travels in Constants, Vol. 12 features three songs, "Untitled", "Quiet Stereo Dee" (an alternate version of "Stereodee" from 4 Satin, the 1997 EP), and "Arundel" (a cover of a Papa M song from the 1999 album, Live from a Shark Cage), all recorded at Sub Station Studio in Cowdenbeath, Scotland in 1999, and produced by Michael Brennan Jr. and Kevin Lynch.

Cover art 
The album cover features a still of Stevie Chalmers scoring the winning goal for Celtic F.C. in the 1967 European Cup Final against Internazionale.

Track listing 
All songs were written by Mogwai, except "Arundel", written by Papa M.
"Untitled" – 6:07
"Quiet Stereo Dee" – 4:06
"Arundel" – 2:59

Personnel 
 Stuart Braithwaite (listed as Holy Stuarto in liner notes) – guitar, keyboard
 Dominic Aitchison (listed as Bearded Monsignor in liner notes) – bass guitar
 John Cummings (listed as John of Arc in liner notes)  – guitar
 Barry Burns (listed as St. Francis of Assassin in the liner notes) – guitar, piano, flute
 Martin Bulloch (listed as Pious Bionicus in the liner notes) – drums
 Michael Brennan Jr. – producer
 Kevin Lynch – producer

Release history 
Travels in Constants, Vol. 12 was made available through Mail order in 2001.

Mogwai EPs
2001 EPs
Temporary Residence Limited albums